Oscar Kennedy (born 21 June 1999) is an English actor having had television roles in Hunted (2012), Outlander (2016), Home from Home (2016–2018), Decline and Fall (2017), Bliss (2018), Ladhood (2019–2022) and Wreck (2022), and in film The Man with the Iron Heart (2017) and School's Out Forever in 2021.

Early life
Kennedy was born in Nottingham. His love of acting grew from attending his school's drama club in primary school and resulted in him auditioning to study at the Television Workshop, which lead to him being cast in his first on-screen role as a young Nigel Slater in Toast. Kennedy is represented by Curtis Brown.

Career
Kennedy starred alongside David Tennant and Emily Watson in the 2013 BBC Two miniseries The Politician's Husband. In the show, he plays Noah, a young man with Asperger syndrome and the son of Tennant and Watson's characters, who is caught in the middle of a family conflict. That same year, he portrayed a young Henry VIII in theThe White Queen.

In 2016, Kennedy portrayed William Grey in an episode of the second season of Starz drama Outlander but was replaced by David Berry in later seasons following a time jump necessitating an older actor. Discussing his time on the show in a 2022 interview with the Daily Express, Kennedy spoke favorably about his appearance and stated that he would be open to returning as the character.

From 2019 to 2022, Kennedy appeared in the BBC iPlayer coming-of-age comedy series Ladhood which was written by and starred Liam Williams and was based on his adolescent experiences. Kennedy played the younger version of Williams' character in all three seasons of the show and received critical accalim for his performance. Kennedy starred alongside Anthony Head, Alex Macqueen and Samantha Bond in the 2021 science fiction film School's Out Forever, which was adapted from the series of novels by Scott K. Andrews and received largely positive cricial reception.

In 2022, Kennedy was cast in the lead role of BBC Three's comedy horror series Wreck, which was created by British writer Ryan J. Brown and focuses on Kennedy's character Jamie, who sneaks onto a cruise ship in order to find out more about the disappearance of his sister.
 When discussing the character, Kennedy contrasted him with his character Liam from Ladhood and stated that “Jamie is a young lad from Sheffield. He's not quite so sure of himself. He's a bit of a social outcast. He's had a troubled home life, and now he’s lost the only person that he cares about and cared about him, his sister Pippa. So his new sole motivation in life is to find out what happened to her.”

Filmography

Film

Television

References

External links

21st-century British actors
English male film actors
English male television actors
Living people
Actors from Nottingham
1999 births